Yinzhou or Yin Prefecture (Chinese: Yínzhōu 銀州; Tangut:  or ) was a zhou (prefecture) in imperial China centering on modern Hengshan County, Shaanxi, China. It existed (intermittently) from 563 to 1106. In the 10th- and 11th-centuries it was mostly controlled by the Tangut people as part of Western Xia (1038–1227) or its precursor, the Dingnan Jiedushi. In 1081 it became territory of the Song dynasty.

Geography
The administrative region of Yinzhou during the Northern Zhou is in modern Shaanxi. It probably includes parts of modern: 
 Under the administration of Yulin:
 Hengshan County
 Mizhi County
 Jia County

References
 

Prefectures of the Sui dynasty
Prefectures of the Tang dynasty
Prefectures of the Song dynasty
Prefectures of Western Xia
Prefectures of Northern Zhou
Former prefectures in Shaanxi